Elsey Abbey, earlier Elsey Priory is a former women's religious house located near Elsey, now part of Hohenlimburg, Hagen, Germany.

It was founded in about 1220 by Friedrich von Isenberg for Premonstratensian canonesses and endowed with the local parish church and other possessions. In the 15th century it became a house of secular canonesses of the nobility (a Damenstift) under an abbess. In the 16th century during the Reformation the parish became Protestant and the abbey followed suit in due course.  

It was dissolved in 1810 during the secularisation of the period.

There remain the Romanesque church and some of the canonesses' houses.

Prioresses 
Walburgis – c 1270
Gertrud von Grevel – c 1394)
Bele Kuling / Kulynges – c 1396
Katharina Snyders – c 1405
Else von Eversberg – c 1414
Regula Dudinck – c 1438

Abbesses 

Margaretha von Neuhof / Greyte van Neyenhove – c 1468–1486
Engela von Holte – c 1501
Ida von Syberg – 1501–1545
Sophie Budberg – 1551–1554
Anna von der Goy – 1556–1577
Katharina von Neheim – 1590–1595
Ludger von Neheim known as Dutscher – 1595–1623
Anna Rump zu Pungelscheid – 1623–1625
Helene von Plettenberg – 1626–1630
Gertrud von der Pforten – 1630–1639
Anna Lucia von Plettenberg – 1639–1640
Helene von Syberg – 1641–1684
Elsebein von Lahr- 1684–1696
Maria Sybilla von Lahr- 1696–1701
Theodora Anna Katharina von Hauss – 1701–1704
Sophia Johanna von Bentheim-Tecklenburg – 1704–1716
Sophie Amelie Dorothee von Bentheim-Tecklenburg- 1716–1753
Anna Christine Katharina von der Bottlenberg known as Kessel – 1753–1776
Amalie Dorothea Elisabeth von der Bottlenberg known as Kessel – 1776–1797
Wilhelmine Sophie von Cornberg- 1797–1802
Louise von Ledebur- 1802–1803

Notes and references

Sources 
 Klueting, E., 1980: Das (freiweltliche) adelige Damenstift Elsey. Geschichte, Verfassung und Grundherrschaft in Spätmittelalter und Frühneuzeit. Freunde der Burg Altena: Altena 1980 Altenaer Beiträge 14 – Freunde der Burg Altena: Altena ISSN 0516-8260 (also: Bochum, Ruhr-Univ., Dissertation 1976)

1220 establishments in Europe
1220s establishments in Germany
1810 disestablishments in Germany
Monasteries in North Rhine-Westphalia
Premonstratensian nunneries
Christian monasteries established in the 13th century
Religious organizations established in the 1220s
Buildings and structures in Hagen
Lutheran women's convents
13th-century churches in Germany